The following are the criteria, rules, and final standings for qualification for the bobsleigh competitions at the 2018 Winter Olympics.

Qualification rules
A maximum of 170 quota spots were available to athletes to compete at the games, a maximum of 130 men and 40 women could have qualified. The qualification was based on the world rankings of 14 January 2018 (the seventh world cup event of the season, in St. Moritz). Pilots had to compete in five different races on three different tracks during the 2016/17 season or 2017/18 season. Each continent (Africa, Americas, Asia, Europe and Oceania) and the hosts were allowed to enter a sled provided they met the above standard. For each men's event 30 sleds were allowed to compete (maximum of three NOCs with three sleds and six NOCs with two sleds). For the women's event there were a total of 20 sleds allowed to compete (maximum of two NOCs with three sleds, four NOCs with two sleds). According to the rules women were eligible for the "4-man" event as well but none competed in the applicable races.

Qualification timeline
Races from 15 October 2017 until 14 January 2018 were used for qualification for the Olympics. In general this meant that the Olympic field was to be established by using the first seven world cup races of the 2017–18 season, but also included results from European, and American cup races. Four sleds then were allocated in each of the three competitions, first for the host (if not already qualified), and then for continents not previously represented. If a nation refused a quota it was reallocated. Unused or reallocated were to be filled by 19 January 2018 by nations not previously entered.

Quota allocation
The following summary is based on the final IBSF quotas after reallocation.  Numbers beside each nation indicate the rank of the sled that establishes the NOC's number of qualifiers.

Current summary

Two man
Final rankings by nation.

 South Korea qualified as the host.

Four man
Final rankings by nation.

 Netherlands refused their allocation. Poland received the reallocated quota place.
 Slovakia were forced to withdraw as their only qualified pilot was deemed ineligible for the Olympics. Romania received the reallocated quota place.
 Australia qualified as a continental representative.
 South Korea qualified as the host.
 Team OAR returned one allocation which could not be filled.

Two woman
Final rankings by nation.

 South Korea qualified as the host.
 Australia qualified as a continental representative but their quota was turned down by their NOC. Romania received the reallocated quota place. 
 Nigeria qualified as a continental representative through the application of IBSF rule 4.1.

References

Qualification for the 2018 Winter Olympics
Qualification